40S ribosomal protein S27 also known as metallopan-stimulin 1 or MPS-1 is a protein that in humans is encoded by the RPS27 gene. Metallopanstimulin is a zinc finger protein proposed to be involved DNA repair as well as oncogenesis.

Function 

Ribosomes, the organelles that catalyze protein synthesis, consist of a small 40S subunit and a large 60S subunit. Together these subunits are composed of 4 RNA species and approximately 80 structurally distinct proteins. This gene encodes a ribosomal protein that is a component of the 40S subunit. The protein belongs to the S27E family of ribosomal proteins. It contains a C4-type zinc finger domain that can bind to zinc. The encoded protein has been shown to be able to bind to nucleic acid. It is located in the cytoplasm as a ribosomal component, but it has also been detected in the nucleus. Studies in rat indicate that ribosomal protein S27 is located near ribosomal protein S18 in the 40S subunit and is covalently linked to translation initiation factor eIF3. As is typical for genes encoding ribosomal proteins, there are multiple processed pseudogenes of this gene dispersed through the genome.

Clinical significance 

Its expression is increased in several types of malignancy and MPS levels have been reported to drop with treatment of some cancers.  It has also been used as a target for some chemotherapies, which aim to chelate out the zinc from the zinc finger motif of the MPS, thus yielding it inactive.  These therapies have shown promise for the treatment of cancer in laboratory experiments and some limited clinical trials.  Head and neck cancer transfected to overexpress this protein have demonstrated suppressed growth.

References

Further reading 

 
 
 
 
 
 
 
 
 
 
 
 
 
 
 
 
 
 

Ribosomal proteins